The 1984 Pacific hurricane season featured numerous tropical cyclones, several of which were impactful to land. It was a busy hurricane season with 21 named storms, 13 hurricanes, and 7 major hurricanes, the latter of which are Category 3 or stronger cyclones on the Saffir–Simpson scale. This activity was unusual given the presence of a La Niña, which typically suppresses Central and East Pacific tropical cyclone activity, and only average sea surface temperatures. Seasonal activity began on May 17 and ended on November 8. This lies within the confines of a traditional hurricane season which begins on May 15 in the East Pacific and June 1 in the Central Pacific, and ends on November 30 in both basins. These dates conventionally delimit the period during each year when most tropical cyclones form.

The drought-stricken Hawaiian Islands received beneficial rainfall from Hurricane Douglas in July and Tropical Storm Kenna in August. The remnants of hurricanes Iselle, Marie, Norbert, and Odile all contributed to enhanced precipitation across the Southwestern United States during the season, including snowfall in higher elevations; flash flooding killed one person in Texas. Hurricane Lowell attracted widespread coverage for damaging the Blue Falcon and forcing the rescue of its 23 crewmembers. In September, torrential rains from Hurricane Odile in Southern Mexico severely damaged crops, inflicted water damage to about 900 homes, and left thousands of residents displaced or without normal services. The storm killed at least 21 people. Multiple hurricanes contributed to rough surf along the California coastline, resulting in one death and hundreds of water rescues.

Systems

Tropical Storm Alma 

On May 13, an area of disturbed weather within the Intertropical Convergence Zone (ITCZ) crossed Panama and Colombia into the East Pacific. Strong westerly wind shear inhibited this disturbance initially, but atmospheric conditions improved over subsequent days, allowing it to become the season's first tropical depression around 18:00 UTC on May 17. The system increased rapidly in size as developing high pressure to its north brought it over very warm ocean waters. The depression intensified into Tropical Storm Alma by 18:00 UTC on May 18, attaining peak winds of  the next day. After fluctuating in intensity for a few days, Alma weakened to a tropical depression and dissipated after 18:00 UTC on May 21.

Hurricane Boris 

A tropical depression developed south of the Gulf of Tehuantepec around 18:00 UTC on May 28. It intensified into Tropical Storm Boris over the next six hours, and further development allowed it to become the season's first hurricane by 12:00 UTC on May 30. The storm conducted a counter-clockwise loop over numerous days, finally tracking west again as ridging redeveloped to its north. The system, which had persisted as a tropical depression during that time, regained tropical storm intensity on June 13 before crossing into cooler waters. Boris dissipated after 00:00 UTC on June 18 to the southwest of the Baja California Peninsula.

Hurricane Cristina 

A weak cold-core low drifted westward across the southern Gulf of Mexico, acting as the impetus for a tropical depression that formed south of Mexico around 06:00 UTC on June 17. The depression intensified into Tropical Storm Cristina within six hours and further organized into a hurricane around 18:00 UTC on June7 19. High pressure over Oklahoma, and upper-level troughing over southern California, both retrograded west as Cristina developed. This caused the storm to track in stair-step fashion throughout its duration. The cyclone weakened to a tropical storm on August 21, but it regained hurricane strength two days later before feeling the effects of an upper-level trough off Baja California. Cristina weakened rapidly, dissipating after 00:00 UTC on June 26.

Hurricane Douglas 

An area of disturbed weather formed east of Clipperton Island on June 23, organizing into a tropical depression around 00:00 UTC on June 25. The newly developed system moved west-northwest and intensified over warm waters, becoming Tropical Storm Douglas by 18:00 UTC on June 25 and strengthening into a hurricane about 48 hours later. At its peak, Douglas displayed a well-defined eye on satellite imagery. Douglas crossed into the Central Pacific as a tropical depression the following day, where it ultimately dissipated after 18:00 UTC on July 6.

Hurricane Elida 

A tropical disturbance formed south of Salina Cruz, Oaxaca, on June 26 and was upgraded to a tropical depression around 00:00 UTC on June 28. By 12:00 UTC the next day, the system intensified into Tropical Storm Elida. The cyclone fluctuated in intensity before starting a more definitive weakening trend after July 3. Around this time, the steering regime around Elida collapsed, causing the system to backtrack toward the east within low-level flow imparted by Tropical Storm Fausto to the north and Hurricane Genevieve to the east. Tracking over cold waters, the system dissipated after 18:00 UTC on July 8.

Hurricane Fausto 

An area of disturbed weather crossed Guatemala into the East Pacific on July 1. It passed over extremely warm waters and rapidly organized accordingly, becoming a tropical depression around 12:00 UTC on July 3 and a tropical storm, Fausto, six hours later. The newly formed cyclone moved northwest, guided by two potent upper-level troughs to its north. After maintaining hurricane strength until July 8, Fausto entered progressively cooler waters and began to weaken. Ridging became established north of the storm, which curved west and dissipated after 00:00 UTC on July 10.

Hurricane Genevieve 

To the southeast of Hurricane Fausto, a new area of disturbed weather formed south of the Gulf of Tehuantepec on July 6. The system coalesced into a tropical depression by 06:00 UTC on July 7; within twelve hours, it became Tropical Storm Genevieve. The system moved northwest parallel to the Mexico coastline, and warm waters facilitated its continued development. Its forward trajectory soon brought the cyclone over colder waters, and the cyclone began to weaken. Genevieve transitioned into an extratropical cyclone three hours later before dissipating.

Tropical Storm Hernan 

A tropical depression formed well south of Baja California Sur at 12:00 UTC on July 27. The cyclone moved west-northwest and then west, becoming Tropical Storm Hernan by 00:00 UTC on July 28. Unlike previous storms before it, Hernan encountered a less conducive environment of cool waters and wind shear. Hernan slowly succumbed to hostile conditions and dissipated after 00:00 UTC on August 1.

Hurricane Iselle 

A tropical disturbance drifted into the Gulf of Tehuantepec on August 3 and organized into a tropical depression around 18:00 UTC that day. A potent upper-level trough dug southward into the coastal waters of California, creating a steering pattern that shunted the system northwest. The depression intensified into a tropical storm 24 hours after formation, a hurricane by 06:00 UTC on August 6, and a major hurricane around 12:00 UTC on August 8.

As the cyclone passed offshore, small craft warnings were enacted along the Mexico coastline. Some street flooding was reported in Acapulco, Guerrero. Farther north in western Texas, moisture from Iselle collided with cooler air from the north, causing thunderstorms and heavy rainfall. Up to  fell in El Paso. Flash flood watches had been hoisted across several counties, and minor street flooding was reported in both El Paso and Juarez. Some mountain roads were impassable. A girl was killed when her normally dry home in a creekbed was overwhelmed by a flood. One person was also injured by lightning. At beaches in Orange County, California, waves up to  necessitated numerous lifeguard rescues. Some 385 rescues occurred in Newport Beach, while an additional 50 people were saved at San Clemente; rescues more than tripled the average at Huntington Beach.

Tropical Storm Julio 

At 00:00 UTC on August 15, a new tropical depression formed south of Acapulco. High pressure, extending across Mexico from the Gulf of Mexico, directed the system west-northwest. An expansive upper-level outflow setup was disrupted by an increase in wind shear, which caused Julio to weaken despite warm ocean waters. The center dissipated about halfway between Socorro Island and Cabo Corrientes, Jalisco, after 12:00 UTC on August 20.

Hurricane Keli 

In mid-August, an area of disturbed weather persisted within the ITCZ across several days. It definitively organized into Tropical Depression One-C around 18:00 UTC on August 16, becoming Tropical Storm Keli six hours later. The storm moved well to the south of the Hawaiian Islands, but it intensified rapidly on a course toward Johnston Atoll. A nearby upper-level trough began to shear Keli, directing its convection to the north; low-level flow, meanwhile, forced the storm's actual center westward. The system dissipated after 00:00 UTC on August 22.

Tropical Storm Kenna 

An area of disturbed weather crossed Panama on August 7. It moved on a persistent westerly course under ridging that extended from California to the Hawaiian Islands. The system organized into a tropical depression over the far western reaches of the East Pacific basin around 18:00 UTC on August 16. Six hours later, it strengthened into Tropical Storm Kenna. Gradual weakening occurred thereafter, and Kenna degenerated to a remnant low after 18:00 UTC on August 21. These rains were beneficial during an ongoing drought.

Tropical Storm Lala 

An area of vigorous thunderstorm activity developed within the ITCZ over the open East Pacific on August 21. It moved west-northwest and acquired a well-defined circulation, thus becoming a tropical depression around 18:00 UTC on August 23. The system crossed into the Central Pacific early on August 26. Lala tracked to the south of the Hawaiian Islands and Johnston Atoll, dissipating after 18:00 UTC on September 2.

Hurricane Lowell 

A tropical wave entered the Gulf of Tehuantepec on August 22. The system moved rapidly westward amid a favorable combination of low wind shear and warm ocean waters. It became a tropical depression around 06:00 UTC on August 26, coalesced into Tropical Storm Lowell twelve hours later, and intensified into a hurricane by 18:00 UTC on August 27. It later encountered cooler waters, which caused the cyclone to dissipate after 06:00 UTC on August 30. As a hurricane, Lowell clipped the  freighter Blue Falcon, cracking its bow and forcing the rescue of 23 crewmembers.

Tropical Storm Moke 

In August 1984, expansive ridging persisted across the North Pacific while a series of cold-core lows wandered underneath. One such upper low persisted near the International Date Line in close vicinity to Midway Island—as evidenced by low temperatures aloft in radiosondes released there—and developed a surface circulation, being declared as a tropical depression by the Japan Meteorological Agency on September 2. While the lack of satellite coverage made tracking the system difficult, forecasters believe it organized into Tropical Storm Moke by 06:00 UTC on September 4. Spotty satellite imagery showed a well-organized storm with hints of an eye. Moke moved north-northeast in advance of an upper-level trough, which soon imparted shear and caused rapid weakening. The system transitioned back into an extratropical cyclone after 00:00 UTC on September 5.

Hurricane Marie 

A tropical depression formed south of Manzanillo, Colima, at 12:00 UTC on September 5. It became Tropical Storm Marie six hours later and further intensified into a hurricane by 00:00 UTC on September 7. As the storm bypassed Baja California to the west, it encountered colder waters and began to weaken. A reconnaissance aircraft mission into the storm later that day measured a large, poorly-defined  diameter eye. Subsequent investigations of Marie found a storm becoming increasingly disheveled over  waters; it dissipated after 00:00 UTC on September 11.

Lifeguards performed more than 30 rescues there. Humidity from the storm spawned swift-moving thunderstorms across southern California. Floods inundated roads, including U.S. Route 95 in California, and frequent lightning caused power outages to dozen of homes.

Hurricane Norbert 

At 18:00 UTC on September 14, the season's next tropical depression developed southwest of Baja California. It strengthened into Tropical Storm Norbert six hours later. Embedded within weak steering flow, the newly named cyclone wound its way north, particularly after upper-level trough developed over the Rocky Mountains. Norbert steadily intensified, organizing into a hurricane around 12:00 UTC on September 16 and a major hurricane by 00:00 UTC on September 18. On September 23, a reconnaissance aircraft intercepted Norbert and its well-defined eye, marking the first time that the inner core of a hurricane was mapped three-dimensionally. Between 00:00–06:00 UTC on September 26, Norbert made landfall near Punta Abreojos as a tropical storm. While the storm is officially recognized as dissipating over Baja California, forecasters in Arizona expressed high confidence that it remained a tropical cyclone into that state.

In the small fishing communities of Punta Abreojos and La Bocana along the coastline of Baja California Sur, 90 percent of structures were demolished. One person was killed, one person was reported missing, and more than $140 million in damage occurred there. The remnants of the cyclone produced sporadic rainfall across Mexico. Slightly higher accumulations were reported in Arizona, where flash flood watches were hoisted across several counties and some school districts released students early owing to those concerns. Normally dry roadways were inundated with runoff, and three people were rescued from a rain-filled streambed. About 50 roads were closed in Tucson and surrounding areas.

Hurricane Odile 

At 18:00 UTC on September 17, a tropical depression formed to the south of Acapulco. It developed into Tropical Storm Norbert six hours later and into a hurricane by 00:00 UTC on September 20. The cyclone originally moved west-northwest and north under the influence of a ridge near Acapulco. However, that ridge shifted southwest while an upper-level trough progressed into northern Mexico, forcing Odile to the east. The system transitioned into an extratropical cyclone and dissipated after six hours.

Between the Zihuatanejo and Acapulco airports, some 87 commercial flights were cancelled, including 50 charter flights. Hotels were deserted across typically busy tourist areas. The heavy precipitation inundated roadways and filtered into the lobby of the Zihuatanejo airport. Throughout the state of Guerrero, 44 riverbank and mountain communities were isolated, encompassing some 30,000 residents. The cyclone overturned a barge on the Atoyac River, resulting in the drownings of 18 passengers and 3 crewmembers. Odile compounded the effects of previous systems which in totality yielded Mexico's wettest year since 1978. Those floods damaged countless structures, severely affected crops, left thousands of residents displaced, and killed many people.

Hurricane Polo 

An area of disturbed weather entered the Gulf of Tehuantepec on September 24, organizing into a tropical depression by 00:00 UTC on September 26. The depression moved west-southwest initially, but it curved northwest after becoming Tropical Storm Polo around 18:00 UTC on September 28. At 00:00 UTC on September 30, Polo became the season's final hurricane. The cyclone curved northeast ahead of an upper-level trough over Baja California, and that feature brought Polo into colder waters and higher wind shear. The system crossed Baja California Sur between 06:00–12:00 UTC on October 3 as a  tropical depression. It dissipated over the Gulf of California after 12:00 UTC.

Moisture from the remnants of the storm streamed north into the Southwestern United States, prompting flash flood watches across Utah, Arizona, New Mexico, and Texas. Heavy rain caused rockslides in Utah west of Castle Dale. Heavy rain across Colorado translated to snow in higher elevations, with advisories warning of the potential for  accumulations.

Tropical Storm Rachel 

A tropical disturbance crossed Costa Rica on October 4. It remained steady state for several days while moving west but ultimately organized into a tropical depression around 18:00 UTC on October 7. The depression encountered warm waters along its track, which fueled its organization into Tropical Storm Rachel by 06:00 UTC on October 9. A broad upper-level trough over Baja California steered the cyclone west-northwest into cooler waters, and it began to weaken. Rachel maintained intensity as a tropical depression for many days before dissipating over the open East Pacific after 12:00 UTC on October 16.

Tropical Storm Simon 

Tropical Depression Twenty-Three, the season's final tropical cyclone, formed in the Gulf of Tehuantepec around 00:00 UTC on October 31. As high pressure centered over the Gulf of Mexico slid west, the newly designated system likewise followed a westerly course. At 00:00 UTC on November 1, the depression intensified into Tropical Storm Simon. Simon soon encountered increasingly cool waters and began to weaken, dissipating over the open East Pacific after 00:00 UTC on November 8 and drawing the season to a close.

Other systems
Outside the purview of the official hurricane database, the Eastern Pacific Hurricane Center also documented several unofficial tropical depressions during the season. On June 29, a poorly organized area of convection formed south-southeast of the Gulf of Tehuantepec. It became a tropical depression on June 30 but failed to organize further owing to influence by Hurricane Elida to its west-northwest. It dissipated south of Acapulco on July 2. A fast-moving disturbance in the ITCZ developed on July 13 and separated from that feature, becoming a tropical depression on July 23. However, it dissipated over colder waters in the far western reaches of the East Pacific two days later. On August 21, another small area of disturbed weather formed along the ITCZ. It coalesced into a tropical depression on August 23 but did not organize further and instead dissipated on August 26 as it crossed into the Central Pacific.

On September 11, another tropical depression formed over the Gulf of Tehuantepec. In spite of very warm ocean waters, the system struggled under the influence of Hurricane Norbert to the west and the close proximity of the Sierra Madre del Sur. On November 3, an area of convection formed northwest of Clipperton Island. It developed into a tropical depression on November 5 but did not intensify further as it met cooler waters. The system dissipated after just twelve hours.

Storm names 
The following names were used for named storms that formed in the eastern Pacific in 1984. Names that were not assigned are marked in gray.

Three names from the Central Pacific list were used – Keli, Lala, and Moke.

Season effects 
This is a table of all the storms that formed in the 1984 Pacific hurricane season. It includes their duration, names, affected areas, damages, and death totals. Deaths in parentheses are additional and indirect (an example of an indirect death would be a traffic accident), but were still related to that storm. Damage and deaths include totals while the storm was extratropical, a tropical wave, or a low, and all the damage figures are in USD. Potential tropical cyclones are not included in this table.

See also 

 List of Pacific hurricanes
 Pacific hurricane season
 1984 Atlantic hurricane season
 1984 Pacific typhoon season
 1984 North Indian Ocean cyclone season
 Australian cyclone seasons: 1983–84, 1984–85
 South Pacific cyclone seasons: 1983–84, 1984–85
 South-West Indian Ocean cyclone seasons: 1983–84, 1984–85

References

External links 

 Eastern North Pacific Tropical Cyclones of 1984
 CPHC's Season Summary

 
Pacific hurricane seasons
Articles which contain graphical timelines
1984 EPAC